Lodi Vecchio is a comune (municipality) in the Province of Lodi in the Italian region Lombardy, which is located about  southeast of Milan and about  west of Lodi. It received the honorary title of city with a presidential decree on January 22, 2006.

History

As testified by its name (meaning "Old Lodi" in Italian), it occupies the site of the ancient Lodi, which originated as a Celtic/Roman town on the Via Aemilia, known as Laus Pompeia. In the mid-4th century it became a bishopric seat.

In the 11th century it fought successfully against the more powerful Milan, until the latter's troops besieged and destroyed it in 1111. In 1158 the town was rebuilt by emperor Frederick I Barbarossa a few kilometers afar, originating the modern Lodi.

People
John of Lodi

References

External links
 Official website

Cities and towns in Lombardy